Caladenia exilis subsp. vanleeuwenii, commonly known as the Moora spider orchid, is a plant in the orchid family Orchidaceae and is endemic to the south-west of Western Australia. It is a relatively rare spider orchid with a single erect, hairy leaf and up to three variably-coloured flowers with a small white, red-striped labellum. It differes from subspecies exilis in having variably coloured flowers, different growth habit, earlier flowering and different habitat.

Description
Caladenia exilis subsp. vanleeuwenii is a terrestrial, perennial, deciduous, herb with an underground tuber which grows singly or in small tufts. The flowers are white, red, pale yellow or cream-coloured. The lateral sepals and petals are more or less drooping with long, dark, thread-like tips. The edge of the labellum has short, forward-facing teeth and there are two rows of red to cream-coloured calli along its centre. Flowering occurs from June to August.

Taxonomy and naming
Caladenia exilis subsp. vanleeuwenii was first formally described in 2001 by Stephen Hopper & Andrew Brown and the description was published in Nuytsia. The specific epithet (vanleeuwenii) honours Steven van Leeuwen, an Australian research scientist who first recognised the species as distinct.

Distribution and habitat
Moora spider orchid occurs between Watheroo and Wongan Hills in the Avon Wheatbelt and Jarrah Forest biogeographic regions where it grows in York gum and salmon gum forests which are wet in winter.

Conservation
Caladenia exilis subsp. vanleeuwenii  is classified as "not threatened" by the Western Australian Government Department of Parks and Wildlife.

References

exilis
Endemic orchids of Australia
Orchids of Western Australia
Plants described in 2001
Taxa named by Stephen Hopper
Taxa named by Andrew Phillip Brown